Green Mountain is a mesa on the eastern flank of the Front Range of the Rocky Mountains of North America.

Mesa

Historical names
Green Mountain – 1906 
Hendricks Peak
Mount Hendricks

See also

List of Colorado mountain ranges
List of Colorado mountain summits
List of Colorado fourteeners
List of Colorado 4000 meter prominent summits
List of the most prominent summits of Colorado
List of Colorado county high points

References

External links

Mesas of Colorado
Landforms of Jefferson County, Colorado
North American 2000 m summits